Lepidopilum grevilleanum is a species of moss in the Pilotrichaceae family. It is endemic to Ecuador.  Its natural habitat is subtropical or tropical moist lowland forests. It is threatened by habitat loss.

Sources

Flora of Ecuador
Hookeriales
Critically endangered plants
Taxonomy articles created by Polbot